Kaokoxylon is an extinct Gondwanan genus of gymnosperms from the Permian and Triassic. Fossils assigned to the genus or its type species, Kaokoxylon zalesskyi, have been found in South America (Brazil, Argentina), India (Bengal), and Antarctica.

In Brazil fossil regions have been found in the region of the Brazilian paleopark, Paleorrota, in the city of Faxinal do Soturno on Linha São Luiz. This outcrop is located in Caturrita Formation.

Description 
Cells of Sclerenchyma are found isolated or in small irregular groups along of pith, without connections.

References

 Kaokoxylon zalesskyi (Sahni) Maheshwari en los niveles superiores de la Secuencia Santa Maria
 O complexo Dadoxylon-Araucarioxylon, Carbonífero e Permiano
 Sommerxylon spiralosus from Upper Triassic in southernmost Paraná Basin (Brazil)
 Técnica de coleta e estabilização de fósseis em pelitos laminados, aplicação em níveis com plantas do Triássico Superior

Araucariaceae
Prehistoric gymnosperm genera